Lenka Antošová (born 27 September 1991) is a Czech rower from Děčín. At the 2012 Summer Olympics in London, she competed in the women's double sculls with her sister Jitka as rowing partner. She also competed in the women's double sculls event at the 2016 Summer Olympics.

The Antošová sisters won the silver medal at the 2009 European Championships, and bronze at the 2011 European Championships.  The team then competed at the 2012 Olympics, winning the B final.

In 2016, teaming with Kristyna Fleissnerova, Lenka Antošová won the bronze medal at the European Championships.  The team won the European Olympic Qualification regatta, securing a place at the 2016 Olympics, where they again reached the B final.

In 2017, Antošová and Fleissnerova won the European Championships which were held in Račice in the Czech Republic.  The team also competed at the 2020 Summer Olympics, reaching the B final.

References

External links
 

1991 births
Living people
Czech female rowers
Olympic rowers of the Czech Republic
Rowers at the 2016 Summer Olympics
Rowers at the 2020 Summer Olympics
People from Děčín
European Rowing Championships medalists
Rowers at the 2012 Summer Olympics
Sportspeople from the Ústí nad Labem Region